Jean-Jacques Pascal known professionally as Pascal Danel (born 31 March 1944) is a French pop singer and composer.

He absconded from his school to become a tightrope walker for a travelling circus.  It was at this point that he assumed his stage name.  An injury following a fall, finished his high-wire days and he turned to song writing as part of his recuperation.

He started his career as a singer in 1962. After two minor hits, he scored a number 1 hit single in France and various European countries with "La Plage aux Romantiques", a gold disc in 1966, followed in 1967 by the international success of "Kilimandjaro", a platinum and number 1 single, recorded by Danel in six languages. The song was recorded more than 180 times by various international artists, and is one of the biggest French standards of the decade.

He then recorded many of his songs not only in French, but also in Italian, Spanish or Japanese, and toured internationally. In 1972, he came in third place in the Rose d'Or d'Antibes song festival singing "Ton Ame".

Many hits followed, including another number one with "Comme Une Enfant" and several Top 10 hits in the late 1960s and 1970s.  Some other singles were only minor hits. In 1979, "La Plage aux Romantiques" hit the Top 5 again, Danel toured again, and released a live album, as well as new songs. He came back in the mid 1980s as a successful TV producer, and hit the charts again in 1989 with a compilation produced by his son, Jean-Pierre, a guitarist and producer, earning Danel another gold disc. His last album with new material was published in 2000.

Between 2007 and 2009, Pascal was one of the few members of a major two years and a half long nostalgic tour, along with some icons of the 1960s, playing sold-out concerts in the biggest French concert halls. The tour sold 1,750,000 tickets.

Hit singles
Je m'en fous (1965) (N°18)
Hop là tu as vu! (1965) (N°16)
La plage aux romantiques (1966) (N°1)
Pierrot le sait (1966) (N°33)
Jeanne (1967) (N°16)
Kilimandjaro (1967) (N°1)
Les trois dernières minutes (1967) (N°6)
Comme une enfant (1967) (N°1)
Mon ami (1967) (N°13)
Avec un bout de crayon (1967) (N°38)
Le Funambule (1968) (N°21)
La Neige est en deuil (1968) (N°14)
L'Italie (1968) (N°32)
Bonjour Madame la Tendresse (1968) (N°20)
Allez viens on danse (1968) (N°24)
Dans la main d'une fille (1969) (N°42)
Un jour d'eté (1969) (N°27)
Mamina (1970) (N°4)
Ton ame (1972) Prix de la Rose d'Or (N°17)
Notre Dame (1972) (N°48)
Je suis un aventurier (1973) (N°2)
Pour un amour (1973) (N°11)
Le Petit Prince n'est pas mort (1973) (N°7)
Comme on est bien ensemble (1973) (N°21)
Rotterdam (1974) (N°13)
La Communale de mes 10 ans (1978) (N°26)
Si l'on vivait ensemble (1978) (N°41)
Et j'ai soudain beaucoup d'amis (1979) (N°50)
La plage aux romantiques (1979) (N°5)
Les grands oiseaux (1980) (N°44)
Un homme fou d'amour (1981) (N°41)
Et si on partait d'ici (1982) (N°19)
La robe d'Organdi (1983) (N°48)
While My Guitar Gently Weeps (duet with Jean-Pierre Danel) (2009) (N°29)

Other singles 
"Soldat soldat" (1964)
"Paul" (1973)
"J'écris ton nom" (1973)
"Ne bouge pas ne parle pas" (1975)
"Je m'appelle comme tu veux" (1976)
"Je suis un homme tout simplement" (1976)
"Le mal de mer" (1977)
"Le coin du dois d'amour" (1981)
"Les rats" (1983)

Albums 
Kilimandjaro – 1967
Collection Record – 1968
Disque d'or – 1970
Impact – 1973
Rotterdam – 1974
Si tu passes le pont – 1975
Ailleurs – 1978
Générique 80 – 1979
Succès – 1980
Olympia 80 – 1980
Un homme fou d'amour – 1981
Les plus belles chansons – 1982
Les Rats – 1983
Les plus grands succès – 1989
Buttafoco – 1994
Je voulais simplement te dire – 2000

Compilations 
Diamond
Master Série
Talents du Siècle
L'Estérel
Kilimandjaro
La plage aux romantiques
Essential
Gold
Mes années vinyl
Les Inoubliables
Sus grandes exitos (Spain)

References 

1944 births
Living people
French male singers
Musicians from Paris